The  is an annual prize for journalism awarded by a coalition of Japanese publishing companies since 1995. Participating companies include mainstream publishers like Kodansha, Shinchosha, and Bungeishunjū.

Past awards

References

Journalism awards
Awards established in 1995
1995 establishments in Japan